The 2019 South Carolina State Bulldogs football team represented South Carolina State University in the 2019 NCAA Division I FCS football season. They were led by 18th-year head coach Oliver Pough who became the program’s all-time winningest coach during the season, surpassing former Head Coach Willie Jeffries. The Bulldogs played their home games at Oliver C. Dawson Stadium. They are a member of the Mid-Eastern Athletic Conference (MEAC).

S.C. State was awarded the MEAC Co-Championship together with the North Carolina A&T Aggies.

Both teams finished with 8–3 overall records and 6-2 within the MEAC, however due to Florida A&M being ineligible for postseason play, and by virtue of North Carolina A&T’s victory over South Carolina State, the Aggies received the MEAC’s bid to the Celebration Bowl.  As a “bubble team” in consideration for the 2019 FCS Playoffs S.C. State was not chosen, thus ending their season.

Previous season

The Bulldogs finished the 2018 season 5–6, 4–3 in MEAC play to finish in a tie for fourth place.

Preseason

MEAC poll
In the MEAC preseason poll released on July 26, 2019, the Bulldogs were predicted to finish in sixth place.

Preseason All–MEAC teams
The Bulldogs had two players selected to the preseason all-MEAC teams.

First Team Offense

Alex Taylor – OL

Second Team Offense

Mike Terry – C

Third Team Offense

Tyrece Nick – QB

Second Team Defense

Tyrell Goodwin – DL

Paul Mckeiver – DL

Third Team Defense

Bruce Johnson – DL

Decobe Durant – DB

Schedule

Game summaries

No. 9 Wofford

Lane

at South Florida

at Delaware State

Florida A&M

Morgan State

at Bethune–Cookman

North Carolina A&T

Howard

at North Carolina Central

at Norfolk State

References

South Carolina State
South Carolina State Bulldogs football seasons
Mid-Eastern Athletic Conference football champion seasons
South Carolina State Bulldogs football